"Say Uncle", "Cry Uncle" and "Uncle!" are idiomatic expressions of speech, used to demand submission from one's opponent. They may also refer to:

Television and film
 Say Uncle (film), a 2005 film directed by Peter Paige
 "Say Uncle" (Steven Universe), a crossover episode of Steven Universe and Uncle Grandpa
 "Say Uncle", an episode of CSI: Crime Scene Investigation
 "Say Uncle", an episode of Family Ties
 "Say Uncle", a 1966 episode of Please Don't Eat the Daisies
 Cry Uncle!, a 1971 film directed by John G. Avildsen
 "Cry Uncle", an episode of The Fugitive
 "Cry Uncle", an episode of The Mod Squad
 "Cry Uncle", an episode of The Real Ghostbusters
 "Cry Uncle", an episode of Tom and Jerry Tales
 "The Say U.N.C.L.E. Affair", an episode of The A-Team

Other
 Say Uncle, a 1988 album by Uncle Slam
 Say Uncle, a 2005 poetry collection by Kay Ryan
 Cry Uncle, a 1995 novel by Judith Arnold